FIBA EuroChallenge (called the FIBA Europe League in 2003–05, and FIBA EuroCup in 2005–08) was the 3rd-tier level transnational men's professional continental club basketball competition in Europe, from 2003 to 2015. It was organized and run by FIBA Europe. It is not to be confused with the FIBA EuroCup Challenge – the now defunct 4th-tier level transnational men's professional continental club basketball competition in Europe, which was also organized and run by FIBA Europe, and played during the 2002–03 to 2006–07 seasons. In 2015, FIBA dissolved the EuroChallenge, in order to start the Basketball Champions League (BCL) and FIBA Europe Cup (FEC), in order to compete with the EuroLeague and EuroCup competitions, which are organized by the rival Euroleague Basketball.

EuroCup promotion
Each season's two EuroChallenge finalists were promoted to the next season's 2nd tier level, the EuroCup competition.

History
The competition was created in 2003, following the defections of most of the top European basketball teams from the former FIBA SuproLeague, which heralded the formation of the new version of the Turkish Airlines EuroLeague, under the umbrella of Euroleague Basketball. From the 2004–05 season, EuroChallenge was considered to be the 3rd strongest international professional basketball competition for men's clubs in Europe, after both the Turkish Airlines EuroLeague and the EuroCup (both of which fall under the supervision of Euroleague Basketball). Though, during the first two seasons of the competition's coexistence with the EuroCup, the EuroChallenge (under the name FIBA Europe League) was favored by Italian, Russian and Greek teams, making both competitions quite comparable in strength.

In 2015, FIBA Europe dissolved the EuroChallenge, to start a new self-anointed second-tier competition, called the Basketball Champions League (BCL), in an attempt to compete with the EuroCup.

Final Fours

All-time EuroChallenge Finals/Final Four MVP award winners (2004–2015)

Records and statistics

Performances by club

Performances by country

Individual records and statistical leaders

All-Star Game

Winning rosters

FIBA Europe League

FIBA EuroCup

FIBA EuroChallenge

References and notes

External links 
 FIBA EuroChallenge official website

 
International club basketball competitions
Defunct basketball cup competitions in Europe
2003 establishments in Europe
Recurring sporting events established in 2003
2015 disestablishments in Europe
Recurring sporting events disestablished in 2015